The following is a list of songs recorded by American thrash metal band Megadeth.

Megadeth
Lists of songs recorded by American artists

List

Notes